The Ulug-Tanzekskoye mine is a large mine located in the southern part of Russia in Tuva. Ulug-Tanzekskoye represents one of the largest tantalum reserves in Russia having estimated reserves of 50 million tonnes of ore grading 0.01% tantalum.

See also 
 List of mines in Russia

References 

Tantalum mines in Russia